Wemyss Castle railway station served the village of East Wemyss , Fife, Scotland, from 1881 to 1955 on the Wemyss and Buckhaven Railway.

History 
The station was opened as East Wemyss on 8 August 1881 by the Wemyss and Buckhaven Railway. To the north was the goods yard, to the east of the platform was the station building and on the platform was the signal box. The station's name was changed to Wemyss Castle on 15 September 1881. A line opened to the west which served Michael Colliery. The station closed on 10 January 1955.

References 

Disused railway stations in Fife
Former North British Railway stations
Railway stations in Great Britain opened in 1881
Railway stations in Great Britain closed in 1955
1881 establishments in Scotland
1955 disestablishments in Scotland